This page is a list of famous ships and sailors of the Royal Navy. The list is composed of famous sailors of the Royal Navy e.g. Horatio Nelson. The list also includes people who are famous and have served with the Royal Navy at some point e.g. Alec Guinness. This list also includes ships that have become famous in their own right, e.g. Mary Rose.

Notable ships 

Mary Rose: sank in 1545 off Portsmouth, in the Battle of the Solent.
Golden Hind: flagship of Sir Francis Drake's circumnavigation and raid on Spanish shipping.
 Ark Royal: flagship of English Fleet against the Spanish Armada. The last  was an  that saw action in the 2003 Iraq conflict.
 Revenge: actively engaged Spanish Armada; later became the subject of a poem by Lord Tennyson detailing her heroic fight against a large Spanish force in 1591.
 : Royal Navy research vessel commanded by Lieutenant James Cook on his first voyage of discovery.
 : scene of the famous mutiny.
 : Nelson's flagship. This ship is still officially in service and is the world's oldest commissioned warship and the flagship of the Second Sea Lord.
 : carried Charles Darwin on his voyage.
 : Britain's first iron hulled, armoured battleship.
 : first "all big-gun" battleship.
 : fought at Jutland and through the Second World War.
 : last battleship built for the Royal Navy & also ran aground in Portsmouth Harbour.
 : first British nuclear-powered submarine.
 : first British strategic ballistic missile submarine.
 : light aircraft carrier.
 : end of the Falklands War signed aboard.
 : The only nuclear-powered submarine to sink an enemy ship.

Notable sailors 
In approximate chronological order.

Sir Humphrey Gilbert
Sir Martin Frobisher
Sir Francis Drake
Robert Blake
George Monck, 1st Duke of Albemarle
James, Duke of York (later James II)
William Penn
Edward Montagu, 1st Earl of Sandwich
George Anson, 1st Baron Anson
Edward Hawke, 1st Baron Hawke
John Benbow
Edward Boscawen
George Rodney, 1st Baron Rodney
Richard Howe, 1st Earl Howe
Samuel Barrington
Samuel Hood, 1st Viscount Hood
Richard Kempenfelt
John Jervis, 1st Earl of St Vincent
James Cook
Erasmus Gower
James Saumarez, 1st Baron de Saumarez
Edward Pellew, 1st Viscount Exmouth
Horatio Nelson, 1st Viscount Nelson
The Prince William (later William IV)
Sir Thomas Hardy, 1st Baronet
Sir George Cockburn, 10th Baronet
Cuthbert Collingwood, 1st Baron Collingwood
Admiral Sir James Stirling
Sir Sidney Smith
Thomas Cochrane, 10th Earl of Dundonald
Sir James Vashon
George Vancouver
William Bligh
Sir John Franklin
Charles Robert Malden
Jackie Fisher, 1st Baron Fisher
Robert Falcon Scott
John Jellicoe, 1st Earl Jellicoe
David Beatty, 1st Earl Beatty
William Boyle, 12th Earl of Cork
Andrew Cunningham, 1st Viscount Cunningham of Hyndhope
James Somerville
Bertram Ramsay
Max Horton
Philip Vian
Prince Albert of York (later George VI) served as midshipman during World War I.
Louis Mountbatten, 1st Earl Mountbatten of Burma
Frederic John Walker
Sir John "Sandy" Woodward

Famous people 
 Anthony Bate, English actor, possibly best known for his role as Oliver Lacon in the BBC television adaptations of the John le Carré novels Tinker, Tailor, Soldier, Spy and Smiley's People, served with the Royal Navy Volunteer Reserve in 1945-47.
 Peter Bull, English character actor, served as an RNVR lieutenant-commander during World War II, awarded the DSC.
 James Callaghan, Prime Minister of the United Kingdom from 1976 to 1979, was conscripted in 1942 as an Ordinary Seaman, and was promoted to Lieutenant in April 1944.
 Sean Connery, actor, enlisted into the Royal Navy in 1946, and served as an anti-aircraft gunner before receiving a medical discharge in 1949.
 Harry H. Corbett, actor famous for Steptoe and Son, served in the Royal Marines during the latter part of World War II.
 Ian Fleming, author of the James Bond novels, served in the Naval Intelligence Division during World War II.
 John Gregson, actor, conscripted to serve on minesweepers in the Royal Navy during World War II. Used this experience playing the Captain of HMS Exeter, in the 1956 film The Battle of the River Plate.
 Alec Guinness, actor, served during World War II, initially as a rating, but later commissioned in 1941. He commanded a landing craft taking part in the invasion of Sicily and Elba and later ferried supplies to the Yugoslav partisans.
 Jack Gwillim, served in the Navy for 20 years rising to the rank of commander, but after being invalided out in 1946 he became a noted character actor. 
 James Robertson Justice, joined the Royal Naval Volunteer Reserve, but after sustaining an injury in 1943 (thought to be shrapnel from a German shell), he was pensioned off.
 Sir Ludovic Kennedy, journalist, broadcaster and author served in the Royal Navy during World War II.
 Laurence Olivier, actor, served in the Fleet Air Arm during World War II, rising to the rank of lieutenant.
 Peter O'Toole, actor, served as a radioman during his National Service in 1950-52.
 Patrick Macnee, actor, served during World War II, with the rank of lieutenant.
 Nicholas Monsarrat, author, served as a RNVR lieutenant-commander during World War II.
 Kenneth More actor, RNVR lieutenant, on board  in Force Q during World War II.
 Prince Philip, Duke of Edinburgh served during and after World War II.  He was Mentioned in Dispatches for his actions at the Battle of Cape Matapan and later commanded the frigate HMS Magpie.  He gave up his naval career when his wife became Queen.
 Jon Pertwee, actor, best known for his portrayal of the Third Doctor in Doctor Who, served during World War II, as an radioman, and was transferred off the  just before it was sunk to become an officer, and served in the security division.
 Michael Redgrave, English stage and film actor, director, manager and author, served in  during World War II.
 Ralph Richardson, actor, served as a lieutenant-commander during World War II.
 Nevil Shute, author and engineer, served as an RNVR lieutenant-commander working on weapons development during World War II.
 Patrick Troughton, actor, best known for his portrayal of the Second Doctor in Doctor Who, served in Coastal Forces during World War II, rising to the rank of lieutenant, and commanding a motor gun boat.
 Godfrey Winn, a British journalist known as a columnist, and also a writer and actor. His book PQ17 was an account of his experiences on Convoy PQ 17 during the Second World War, serving in HMS Pozarica. See also 'Home from the Sea' published in 1944.

See also

Royal Navy

History of the Royal Navy
Royal Navy
Royal Navy lists